Aspide (the Italian name for the asp) is an Italian medium range air-to-air and surface-to-air missile produced by Selenia (then by Alenia Aeronautica, now a part of Leonardo S.p.A.). It is provided with semi-active radar homing seeker. It is very similar to the American AIM-7 Sparrow, using the same airframe, but uses an inverse monopulse seeker that is far more accurate and much less susceptible to ECM than the original conical scanning version.

This resemblance, and that Selenia was provided with the technology know-how of the AIM-7 (around 1,000 of which it had produced under licence), has generally led non-Italian press to refer to the Aspide as a Sparrow variant. However, the Aspide had original electronics and warhead, and a new and more powerful engine. Closed-loop hydraulics were also substituted for Sparrow's open-loop type, which gave Aspide better downrange maneuverability. Even the control surfaces are different, replacing the original triangular wings, fixed in the air-to-air and instead foldable in the surface-to-air version, to a newly designed common cropped delta fixed version.

A similar design is the UK's Skyflash, which entered service about the same time. The US's own Sparrow fleet also added a monopulse seeker in the AIM-7M versions of 1982.

Design

Aspide, in its various versions, was used both in the air-to-air role, carried by Aeritalia F-104s in the apposite versions F-104S and F-104ASA, and in the surface-to-air naval role. In the latter role it has been replaced by the MBDA Aster. Naval Aspide launchers can be adapted to fire the Sparrow by merely switching a single circuit board.

In the mid 1980s, China imported a small batch of the Aspide Mk.1 from Italy, then signed an agreement with Alenia to produce the missile locally under license. In 1989, China produced its first batch of Aspide Mk.1 missiles using imported parts from Italy.  However, due to the EEC arms embargo imposed after the 1989 Tiananmen Square protests and massacre, China was unable to purchase additional Aspide kits. China subsequently developed its own missile family based on the Aspide Mk.1, with surface to air versions designated as the LY-60, and an air-to-air version designated as PL-11.

The rocket engine of the Aspide is produced by Turkish missile manufacturer Roketsan. It weighs about 75 kg and produces 50 kN of thrust for 3.5 s.

Variants
 Aspide Mk.1 – Similar to AIM-7E, with Selenia monopulse semi-active seeker and SNIA-Viscosa solid-propellant rocket motor. This version was popular with export customers, and sold to 17 countries. The surface-to-air systems are Skyguard and Spada.
 Aspide Mk.2 – Improved version with active radar-homing seeker.  Development was shelved in favor of better missiles, such as the AIM-120 AMRAAM.
 Aspide 2000 – Improved surface-to-air version of the Aspide Mk.1, used on export  Skyguard and Spada 2000 air-defense systems.
 Aspide Citedef – Surface-to-air version of the Aspide Mk.1 upgraded by Citedef.

Systems 

 Skyguard I – VSHORAD/SHORAD from Oerlikon Contraves with radar tracking, upgradeable to support Aspide 2000.
 Skyguard II – Improved VSHORAD/SHORAD from Oerlikon Contraves with added electro-optical tracking.
 Toledo – Skyguard with Skydor fire control system from Navantia and Aspide launchers.
 Spada – SHORAD from Selenia  with Selenia PLUTO 2D radar, upgradeable to support Aspide 2000.
 Spada 2000 – Improved SHORAD from Alenia Aeronautica  with Thomson-CSF RAC 3D radar.
 Albatros Mk.2 – Naval SHORAD from Selenia, upgradeable to support Aspide 2000.

Operators

 - MEKO 360 ships, 150 Mk1 ordered in 1979 and delivered in 1983–1984
 - 100 Aspide 2000 ordered in 1996 and delivered in 2001–2004 - São Paulo aircraft carrier, Niterói class frigates
 - 90 Aspide Mk.1 ordered in 1986 and delivered in 1987–1991. Technology used in development of PL-11 
 - 130 used in existing Skyguard system; ordered in 1991 and delivered in 1991–1992 (deal worth $114 m included 12 launchers)
 - 50 used on Esmeraldas Class Corvette (variant of Fincantieri Tipo 550); ordered in 1979 and delivered in 1982–1984
 – 72 used on Descubierta (Abu Qir) class corvettes; ordered in 1983 and delivered in 1984
 - 75 for Elli-class frigates (variant of Kortenaer-class); ordered in 1980 and delivered in 1981–198

 - used on-board F-104S; used on 7 Spada SAM batteries; used on 24 Skyguard SAM batteries; used on 32 naval Albatros Mk.2 SAM system
 - 320 ordered in 1988 and delivered in 1988–1997 for Skyguard Amoun SAM System; 175 Aspide 2000 ordered in 2007 and delivered in 2008–2010 part of $565m deal, for modernization Aspide; 250 Aspide 2000 ordered in 2007 and delivered in 2008–2013 part of $65 m deal for Skyguard AD systems 
 - 8 ordered in 1978 and delivered in 1983 for use on Albatros Mk.2 SAM on modernised Libyan frigate Dat Assawari
 - 18 ordered in 1995 and delivered in 1997 for Laksamana Class corvette
 - Used in the frigate 501 Lt. Col. Errhamani (Descubierta); 40 ordered in 1977 and delivered in 1983
 - 25 Aspide MK.1 ordered in 1977 and delivered in 1982 for Meko-360 Aradu frigate; other 10 Aspide MK.1 ordered in 1982 and delivered in 1983

 - 750 Aspide 2000 for ground-based air defence system (10 batteries Spada 2000) ordered in 2007 and delivered in 2010-2013 part of 415 m Euro deal 
 - 150 ordered in 1974 and delivered in 1979–87 for use on Lupo (Carvajal) class frigate
 - 200 ordered in 1985 and delivered in 1987–89 part of $230 m deal for 13 Skyguard systems, later upgraded to Skydor, with the missiles retired in 2020; 51 Aspide 2000 ordered in 1996 and delivered in 1997–99 for 2 Spada 2000 SAM systems
 – 24 ordered in 1984 and delivered in 1986–1987 for use on Ratanakosin Class corvettes; 75 ordered in 1986 and delivered in 1988 for use by Royal Thai army on 1 Spada SAM system
 - 144 ordered in 1986 and delivered in 1987–1989 for MEKO 200T (Yavuz class) frigate; 72 ordered in 1990 and delivered in 1995–1996 for MEKO 200T-2 (Barbaros class) frigate
 - 100 ordered in 1975 and delivered in 1980–1982 for use with Albatros Mk.2 SAM system on Lupo Class frigates
 - Spain will train and gift Ukraine with the Aspide 2000 missile system, with Ukrainian soldiers having finished training on 14 October. On 7 November Ukrainian Defence Minister Oleksiy Reznikov announced that Ukraine had received the first NASAMS system from the US, along with the Italian made Aspide.

References

External links
 Albatros | Maritime Superiority, Aspide 2000 solution, MDBA

Air-to-air missiles of Italy
Naval surface-to-air missiles
Military equipment introduced in the 1970s